Robert Bella  is an American filmmaker, best known for his work as a television Director, Writer & Producer on shows such as The Rookie, Castle and The Following. Bella produced and directed the indie comedy Colin Fitz Lives! He has also worked on over 100 plays as an actor, director, producer and writer. He is a co-author of Training of the American Actor, and he wrote the stage adaptation of the film Stand and Deliver.

Early life
Bella was born in Brooklyn, New York. He received a Bachelor of Fine Arts from the Tisch School of the Arts at New York University, where he studied acting with Stella Adler, David Mamet and William H. Macy.

Career
When he was 23 years old, Bella became an NYU adjunct faculty member. By the time he was 25, he was teaching Master Classes around the world, on subjects such as directing, script analysis, performance technique, on-camera acting and audition skills.  His former acting students include Jessica Alba, Rose Byrne, Heather Burns, Justin Chatwin, Abbie Cornish, Peter Facinelli, Matthew Fox, Bryan Greenberg, Diane Neal, Jason Ritter and Skeet Ulrich.

Bella became one of the founding members the Atlantic Theater Company, where he served as the Managing Director, Associate Artistic Director and Executive Director of the Atlantic Acting School. His experience producing and directing numerous Off-Broadway plays ultimately led him to try his hand at filmmaking.

TV and film
In 1996, Bella produced and directed the independent film Colin Fitz Lives!. The film tells the story of two security guards who must protect a rock star's grave against excitable fans who may attempt to commit suicide there. It was shot on 35mm in New York City. The budget was $150,000, and the film was shot in 14 days. It had its World Premiere in Dramatic Competition at the 1997 Sundance Film Festival. The film won awards at numerous film festivals, including the Austin Film Festival, WorldFest-Houston International Film Festival and the Long Island Film Festival, but it did not receive distribution until IFC Films released the movie on-demand in 2010.

Bella has worked as an ADR Director with numerous actors, including: Chevy Chase, Judi Dench, Jimmy Fallon, Whoopi Goldberg, Bill Hader, Freddie Highmore, Harvey Keitel, William H. Macy, Catherine O'Hara, Christina Ricci and Jon Stewart.

Bella also worked as a Post Production Supervisor for various film studios, including DreamWorks Pictures.  His credits include Delivery Man, Lincoln, War Horse, Real Steel, The Help and I Am Number Four.

He has worked as a TV Director/Writer/Producer on shows such as The Rookie, Castle and The Following.

Personal life
Bella is currently resides in Los Angeles, California.

Filmography

Theater

Awards and nominations
Film Festival Awards
Gold Award: Won, 1997, for Comedy
Grand Jury Prize: Nomination, 1997, for Dramatic
Best of Fest: Won, 1997, for Feature Film Competition
Grand Jury Award: Nomination, 1997, for Narrative
Feature Film Award: Nomination, 1997 (shared with Tom Morrissey)
Feature Film Award: Won, 1997, for Best Feature
Audience Award: Won, 1997.

References

External links

YouTube Channel
Instagram

1963 births
American male film actors
American male screenwriters
American male stage actors
Date of birth missing (living people)
Film producers from New York (state)
Living people
American voice directors
Writers from Brooklyn
American theatre directors
20th-century American dramatists and playwrights
20th-century American male writers
Film directors from New York City
Screenwriters from New York (state)